Madhav Ramanuj (born 22 April 1945) is a Gujarati poet and writer from Gujarat, India. Tame (1972) and Anahadnu Ekant (2013) are his collections of poems. He won Narsinh Mehta Award (2012) and Sahitya Gaurav Puraskar (2016) for his contribution in Gujarati literature.

Early life 
Ramanuj was born in Pachchham, a village in Ahmedabad district of the Indian state of Gujarat. His father was Odhavdas Ramanuj. He completed the Diploma of Arts in Applied Arts from Sheth C. N. College of Fine Arts in 1973. He joined the same college as professor of Applied Arts in 1973, and retired as the principal of the same college. He became an editor of Akhand Anand in 1969. He worked with publication house, Vora and Co. in 1969-70. He designed books covers for R. R. Sheth & Co. from 1970 to 1973.

He served as the president of Gandharv Sangeet Vidyalaya Trust, Ahmedabad and Gujarati Sahitya Parishad. He was an adviser of Doordarshan, Ahmedabad. He worked as head of the Human Resource Department of Institute Kidney Diseases and Research Centre (IKDRC) at Ahmedabad. He set up the 'Kidney Theatre' group at IKDRC, which organises plays for awareness on kidney related ailments.

Works 

Tame (You; 1972), Aksharnu Ekant (1997) and Anahadnu Ekant (2013) are his collections of poems. Pinjarni Aarpar (1990) is his biographical novel about Reuben David, who was the founder of the Ahmedabad Zoo. Suryapurush (1997, 1999) is his two parts biographical novel about Chimanbhai Patel, the former Chief Minister of Gujarat.

He wrote lyrics for songs of Gujarati films. He won state prizes for Pithi Pili Ne Rang Rato (1974) and Derani Jethani (1999).

His plays include Rag-Vairag (2000) and Akshar nu Amrut.

Recognition 
He received the Narsinh Mehta Award in 2012 and the Sahitya Gaurav Puraskar award.

Personal life 
Ramanuj  married Lalita and they have a daughter, Deepti. His younger daughter Neha committed suicide on 5 October 2009.

See also
 List of Gujarati-language writers

References

1945 births
Living people
Poets from Gujarat
Gujarati-language writers
Indian male poets
Gujarati-language poets
People from Ahmedabad district
20th-century Indian poets
20th-century Indian male writers